Midterm parliamentary elections were held in Cuba on 1 November 1914 in order to fill half the seats in the House of Representatives, as well as a single seat in the Senate. The National Conservative Party was the biggest winner, taking 22 of the 49 House seats and the sole Senate seat.

Results

House of Representatives

Candidates for Representatives of La Habana Province 
National Conservative Party (NCP)

 Gustavo Pino
 Raul de Cardenas (Incumbent)
 Miguel Coyula (Incumbent)
 Alfredo Betancourt Manduley
 Federico G. Morales (Incumbent)
 Felipe Gonzalez Sarrain (Incumbent)
 Gonzalo Freyre de Andrade

Liberal Party of Cuba (LPC)

 Eugenio L. Azpiazo
 Generoso Campos Marquetti
 Juan Gualberto Gómez
 Benito Lagueruela
 Carlos Guas Pagueras

Unionist Liberal Party (ULP)

 Manuel Varona Suárez
 Miguel Maniano Gómez
 Enrique Roig (Incumbent)

Cuban National Party (CNP)

 José d'Estrampes

Candidates for Representatives of Pinar del Rio Province

Candidates for Representatives of Matanzas Province 

***Diario de la Marina places Celso with the Liberal Party of Cuba, while Crónica Cubana places him with the Liberal Unionist Party.

Candidates for Representatives of Santa Clara Province 

Other Elected Representatives of Santa Clara Province

 Roberto Mendez Pendant (ULP)

Candidates for Representatives in Oriente Province 

Other Elected Representatives of Oriente Province

 Manuel Diaz Ramirez (Liberal Provincial)
 Eduardo Beltran Moreno (Liberal Provincial)

Elected Representatives of Camagüey Province 

 Julio C. del Castillo (LPC) (Incumbent)
 Aurelio Alvarez (NCP)

* Underline indicates that a candidate was elected to a seat in the Senate.

** Votes come from a source that reported on November 6th, and may not have been completely tabulated at the time of reporting.

Allegations of Fraud 
Although there were initial reportings of a steady and well-organized election, later information would come to dispute that, starting with a controversy regarding whether or not President Mario Menocal should have been allowed to vote, due to him having failed to register in the district that he lived in. Later evidence would come forth showing an election that was tampered with ballot harvesting and voter fraud.

As reported by the Journal Gazette, allegations of fraud were rampant following the conclusion of the election. It was reported that there was a <10% voter turnout, yet the La Habana Province saw a voter turnout of 1,200,000, despite the fact that 7 years prior, the entire population of Cuba was barely above 2,000,000 people. Votes were alleged to be sold in lots for $200. Despite calls for an anullment of the election due to fraud, the election was not recalled. It is generally believed that the election was, at least in party, fraudulent. The Wilkes-Barre Semi-Weekly Record, while not reporting fraud, echoed similar concerns of inconsistency and suspicion regarding population issues in La Habana province.

The Baltimore Sun reported similar claims. 2 days after the election, the 10% voter turnout statistics had been leaked. It was also recorded that some of the alleged voter fraud contained the names of dead men, such as Evaristo Estenoz, who had died a 4 years before the election during the Negro Rebellion. Later, it was reported that the Senate had failed to fill a quorum, and a message written by President Menocal regarding the state of the agricultural sector's economy. Earlier in the year, the Sun had reported on fradulent votes within the senate, stating that in the process to elect a Speaker of the House back on August 31st had 3 more votes cast than there were members in Congress, leading to more suspicion that the 1914 nationwide election could have been tampered with.

References

Cuba
Parliamentary elections in Cuba
1914 in Cuba
November 1914 events
Election and referendum articles with incomplete results